The Town of Lunenburg was incorporated in 1888. There have been 19 mayors of the town as of 2020.

Mayors
Augustus J. Wolff 1888-1891
S. Watson Oxner 1891-1895
Augustus J. Wolff 1895-1899
Daniel J. Rudolf 1899-1902
Allan R. Moreash 1902-1910
Augustus J. Wolff 1910-1911
John James Kinley 1911-1914
J. Frank Hall 1914-1916
William Duff 1916-1922
Arthur W. Schwartz 1922-1930
Wallace E. Knock 1930-1934
Arthur W. Schwartz 1934-1946
L.L. Hebb 1946-1948
Douglas F. Adams 1948-1952
F. Homer Zwicker 1952-1956
Roy M. Whynacht 1956-1958
R.G.A. Wood 1958-1971
Sherman Zwicker 1971-1979
Laurence Mawhinney 1979-2012
Rachel Bailey 2012–2020
Matt Riser 2020-present

References

Lunenburg
Lunenburg County, Nova Scotia